There are several newspapers named the Daily Press:

Hong Kong
 Daily Press (Hong Kong), a defunct English-language newspaper formerly published in Hong Kong

United States
 Ashland Daily Press, a daily newspaper based in Ashland, Wisconsin
 Daily Press (California), a daily newspaper published in Victorville, California
 Daily Press (Michigan), a daily newspaper (Monday through Saturday) published in Escanaba, Michigan
 Daily Press (Virginia), a daily newspaper published in Newport News, Virginia
 Silver City Daily Press and Independent, a daily newspaper (Monday through Saturday) published in Silver City, New Mexico

See also
 Press (newspaper)

Lists of newspapers